Albert Edward William ('Loma') Miles (16 Jan 1912 – 16 Mar 2008) was a British academic dentist.  He was also Professor of Dental Surgery and Pathology at London Hospital Medical College Dental School between 1950 and 1976, published a number of significant books in the field of academic dentistry, and developed a technique for assessing a subject's age from the extent of wear on the teeth.

Early life

Miles was born in London in 1912, before graduating in both medicine and dentistry from London's Royal Dental Hospital.

Personal life

Throughout his life, Miles was a socialist.  He was a 'vociferous' opponent of the 2003 Iraq War.  He survived his long-term partner, Diana, by three years.

Significant works include:

 Structural and Chemical Organisation of Teeth (1967)
 Teeth and Their Origins (1972)
 Variations and Diseases of the Teeth in Animals (1990, with Caroline Grigson)

His final work, a book on the early history of the Royal Army Medical Corps was published posthumously, in 2009.

References

British dentists
1912 births
2008 deaths
20th-century dentists